Blaise Yepmou Mendouo (born 2 January 1985 in Douala) is a Cameroonian boxer.  He competed in the super heavyweight event at the 2012 Summer Olympics and was eliminated in the round of 16 by Mohamed Arjaoui of Morocco. After his defeat, he was one of seven Cameroonian athletes who disappeared from the Olympic Village.

References

1985 births
Living people
Super-heavyweight boxers
Olympic boxers of Cameroon
Boxers at the 2012 Summer Olympics
Boxers at the 2010 Commonwealth Games
Commonwealth Games bronze medallists for Cameroon
Sportspeople from Douala
Cameroonian male boxers
Commonwealth Games medallists in boxing
20th-century Cameroonian people
21st-century Cameroonian people
Medallists at the 2010 Commonwealth Games